Liu Kuo-tsai (1911–1993) was a Taiwanese politician. Elected to the Legislative Yuan in 1969, he was named deputy speaker in 1972. In 1988, he became the acting President of the Legislative Yuan. The interim designation was removed early next year and Liu stepped down from the position in 1990.

Political career
Born in Miaoli, Taiwan in 1911, Liu graduated from Kyoto Imperial University before studying law at Kwansei Gakuin University, both in Japan. He was first elected to the Legislative Yuan in 1969. On 5 May 1972, Liu was sworn in as Vice President of the Legislative Yuan. Ni Wen-ya was elected speaker. He served three terms in that position before running for President of the Legislative Yuan in 1989. By 1990, Liu was a senior adviser to President Lee Teng-hui and in October, became a founding member of the National Unification Council.

On 12 February 1990, Liu announced his resignation from the Legislative Yuan. Liu died in 1993 due to cardiac arrest stemming from ventricular fibrillation.

References

1993 deaths
1911 births
Miaoli County Members of the Legislative Yuan
Taiwanese Presidents of the Legislative Yuan
Kuomintang Members of the Legislative Yuan in Taiwan
Members of the 1st Legislative Yuan in Taiwan
Kyoto University alumni
Kwansei Gakuin University alumni
Senior Advisors to President Lee Teng-hui
Taiwanese politicians of Hakka descent